The 2014 MTV Fandom Awards, honoring fan favorite movies and television shows for 2014, was held on July 24, 2014 and broadcast on July 27 on MTV.

Performances
 Linkin Park
 G-Eazy

Presenters
 Jenna Dewan-Tatum — presented Visionary Award
 Diego Luna
 Kellan Lutz
 Chloë Grace Moretz
 Tyler Posey
 Retta
 Channing Tatum
 Steven Yeun

Winners and nominees
The full list of nominees was announced on June 19, 2014. Winners are listed first and in boldface.

Visionary Award
John Green

References

External links
 
 

2014 awards
2014 in American television